Microdorcadion is a genus of longhorn beetles of the subfamily Lamiinae, containing the following species:

 Microdorcadion laosense Breuning, 1950
 Microdorcadion tuberculatum Pic, 1925

References

Morimopsini